Avid DS (which was called Avid DS Nitris until early 2008) is a high-end offline and finishing system comprising a non-linear editing system and visual effects software.  It was developed by Softimage (this company was owned by Microsoft at the time of DS v1.0's launch before being acquired from Microsoft by Avid Technology, Inc. shortly thereafter) in Montreal.

DS was discontinued on September 30, 2013 with support ending on the same date next year.

Software

DS was called ‘Digital Studio’ in development. It was envisioned to be a complete platform for video/audio work. The first previews of the system were on the SGI platform, but this version was never released. The system was rewritten on Windows NT with different video hardware platforms (Matrox DigiSuite or Play Trinity running on a NetPower system) before the final system was released on Intergraph/StudioZ hardware in January 1998.

After its acquisition by Avid, DS was always positioned as a high end video finishing tool. However, many users found it to be uniquely soup-to-nuts in its capabilities. From version 1.0 of the product, it competed with products like Autodesk Smoke, Quantel and Avid Symphony. The toolset in DS offered video timeline editing, an object-oriented vector-based paint tool, 2D layer compositing, sample based audio and starting with version 3.01 of the product, a 3D environment. Originally, a subset of the SoftimageXSI 3D software was planned to become part of the DS toolset, both were built on the same software foundation, but over time the code bases divided between the applications and the integration never happened.

While the first version of the DS still lacked a few key features (no 3D, poor keying, no real-time effects), it had some significant features compared to the competing products at the time. It offered a large number of built in effects. Avid OMF import was available, positioning Softimage DS as a strong finishing tool for then typical off-line Avid systems. Lastly the integration of the toolset of Softimage DS was beyond what other product offered. A Softimage DS user could quickly go from editing, to paint, to compositing with a few mouse clicks all inside the same interface. Some of the lacking features where quickly resolved, within months of version 1.0 a new chroma keyer was released.

Early versions of the software (up thru 4.0) added additional key features. Development continued with one of the first uncompressed HD editing systems (version 4.01) and an attempt to make the system more friendly to Media Composer editors in version 6. In later versions (v7.5 on beyond)  DS was criticized for slow development of compositing tools, mainly lack of a new 3D environment and better tracking tools. Many DS users felt that Avid had not been giving DS the attention that it deserved.

On July 7, 2013, Avid sent out an email marking the end of life of the DS product.

"To Our Avid DS customers, We are writing to inform you that Avid will be realigning our business strategy to focus on a core suite of products to best leverage our developmental and creative resources. As part of this transition, we will be ceasing future development of Avid DS with a final sale date of September 30th, 2013"

Hardware

Up until version 10.5, DS was sold as a turn-key system; the software was not available without purchasing CPU, I/O and storage hardware from Avid. Beginning with 10.5, customers were able to configure their own systems using widely available components, based on recommended system requirements. In turn-key systems, there were many hardware refreshes over time.

StudioZ single stream: Intergraph TDZ-425 with 30 minutes of uncompressed SCSI storage. CPUs at the time were Pentium II/300 MHz.

StudioZ dual stream: Intergraph TDZ-2000 GT1 with one hour of fibre channel storage. CPUs on first systems were Pentium II/400 MHz, but last shipping systems had Pentium III/1 GHz. DS was one of the first applications to show that real-time effects could be processed with just the CPUs of the system, not requiring special video cards with real-time effect hardware.

Equinox: Developed by Avid, it was one of the first uncompressed HD video cards available. Systems were available on CPUs from Pentium III/1 GHz to Pentium 4/2.8 GHz. Storage was typically SCSI, but fibre channel was also supported.

Nitris DNA: Developed by Avid, the Nitris hardware was probably the largest hardware update to the system since it was released. 10-bit HD and SD support was standard. Real-time down and cross convert. This was the only hardware for DS that had on-board effect processing. This allowed a system at the time to play back dual-stream uncompressed HD effects in real-time at 16-bit precision. This was also the first hardware from Avid to support the DNxHD codec. Starting with Pentium 4, Intel Core Xeons were supported. SCSI storage was primarily used.

AJA Video Systems: First available as a 4:4:4 option to be used in conjunction with Nitris hardware. Final-generation DS systems used the AJA Video Systems Kona 3 (Xena 2K) card as the only I/O for the system. The last systems shipped with two Intel Core Xeon 6-core processors. SAS is the recommended storage for these systems.

History

References

External links
Avid official site
Avid DS Support Center

Film and video technology
Graphics software